Eucithara cincta is a small sea snail, a marine gastropod mollusk in the family Mangeliidae.

Description
The length of the shell attains 7.5 mm.

The whorls are rather narrowly shouldered, the shoulder-angle sharp pointed by the ribs, which attain the suture. The interstices of the ribs show revolving striae. The color of the shell is yellowish brown, with a broad superior darker band.

Distribution
This marine species occurs off the Philippines.

References

  Reeve, L.A. 1846. Monograph of the genus Mangelia. pls 1-8 in Reeve, L.A. (ed). Conchologia Iconica. London : L. Reeve & Co. Vol. 3.

External links
  Tucker, J.K. 2004 Catalog of recent and fossil turrids (Mollusca: Gastropoda). Zootaxa 682:1-1295.

cincta
Gastropods described in 1846